The Red Cross of the Democratic Republic of the Congo is the Red Cross member organization for the Democratic Republic of the Congo. It was admitted to the IFRC in 1963. An unrelated earlier Red Cross society had existed in the Congo Free State under King Leopold II of Belgium's rule, and disbanded in 1909.

References

External links 
 Official website
 ICRC profile

Congo
Medical and health organisations based in the Democratic Republic of the Congo